Nyerere National Park (formerly the northern part of Selous Game Reserve, pronunciation: "Seluu") is the largest national park in Tanzania and also one of the world's largest wildlife sanctuaries and national parks. The area is larger than 70 countries in the world and is estimated to be twice the size of Costa Rica (Central America) and about twice the size of Belgium (Europe). Much of the area is in a wild state without being altered by human activities.
The part of Selous game reserve is now running a hydro electric power. The park has a great river known as Rufiji River. Rufiji is Tanzania's largest river and is home to many crocodiles and hippopotamuses. It is also one of largest mangrove forests in the world located at its delta.

History
The original Selous Game Reserve traces its roots to 1896 when the then German Governor of Tanganyika proclaimed this vast area as a protected wildlife hunting reserve. Sometime in 1922 the reserve was named after Frederick Selous, a big game hunter turned wildlife conservationist. In 2019, it was decided by the Government of Tanzania that to further develop and enhance tourism in Selous, the northern part of the reserve will be excised to form the a new national park to be known as the Nyerere National Park,  in honor of the first President of Tanzania, Mwalimu Julius Kambarage Nyerere. This new park was formally gazetted as a National Park in 2019 and now falls under the administration of TANAPA (Tanzania National Parks Authority ).

Wildlife
Nyerere National Park is home to several species of wildlife: lions, wildebeests, giraffes, zebras, hippopotamuses, rhinos, antelopes, hyenas, African wolves, and a large number of crocodiles in the Rufiji River. Most notably the park is also known for its prolific population of African Wild Dogs.

Previously and even now, Selous Game Reserve and by extension, Nyerere National Park, was home to a large number of elephants but due to poaching, the numbers have dropped somewhat and it is now hoped that converting part of the reserve to a National Park will help control and minimize poaching.

Getting There

Nyerere National Park can be accessed by road safari from either Dar es Salaam or Arusha. The road distance varies from 184 km to 230 km depending on which gate or entry point of Nyerere National Park you want to access. In terms of journey time, typically you want to allow for 6 hours for most Park entry gates such as Mtemere and Matembwe, and up to 6 to 6.5 hours for gates on the northern side of Selous Game Reserve. Road conditions are poor in places with the last 75 km to the park being on a bumpy gravel road.

The park can also be accessed by air. There are daily scheduled flights from either Dar es Salaam and Zanzibar with a flight time of under an hour to a variety of different airstrips in Nyerere. There are several airlines serving this route, some of which includes Regional Air, Coastal Aviation, Safari Air Link and Auric Air. All these airlines have a reliable service and credible safety record.

All visitors planning for a fly-in safari to Nyerere National Park needs to know which airstrip in Nyerere Park they should use when booking their flights. There are quite a number of them in the park to avoid unnecessary long transfers (which also happens to be rather costly). Some of the most common airstrips include Mtemere, Matambwe, Sumbazi, Kiba, Beho Beho and Siwandu.

Gallery

See also
 Selous Game Reserve
 List of protected areas of Tanzania

Further reading

References 

National parks of Tanzania
IUCN Category II
Eastern miombo woodlands
Tourist attractions in the Lindi Region
Geography of Lindi Region